Autumn Song may refer to:

 "Chanson d'automne", an 1866 poem by Paul Verlaine
 Autumn Song (Mannheim Steamroller album), released in 2003
 Autumn Song (Mose Allison album), released in 1959
 "Autumnsong", a song by Manic Street Preachers from their 2007 album Send Away the Tigers
 Autumn Song (character), a fictional character in the 2007 Image Universe comic book series Proof
 "Autumn Song", a song by God Is an Astronaut from the 2013 album Origins

See also
 "Autumn" (song) by Strawbs, from their 1974 album Hero and Heroine